The Ministerial Council on Energy (MCE) was established as a committee of the Council of Australian Governments in June 2001.  It was superseded by the Standing Council on Energy and Resources in June 2011.

During its time, it was responsible for a range of initiatives including:
 Equipment Energy Efficiency Program
 National Framework for Energy Efficiency
 Reform of Energy Markets - issued 11 December 2003

See also

Australian Energy Regulator
Australian Energy Market Commission

References

Energy policy of Australia
2001 establishments in Australia
2011 disestablishments in Australia
Council of Australian Governments